Malgobeksky District (Maghalbika šaꜧar) is an administrative and municipal district (raion), one of the four in the Republic of Ingushetia, Russia. It is located in the north of the republic. Its administrative center is the town of Malgobek (which is not administratively a part of the district). As of the 2010 Census, the total population of the district was 47,754.

Administrative and municipal status
Within the framework of administrative divisions, Malgobeksky District is one of the four in the Republic of Ingushetia and has administrative jurisdiction over all of its twelve rural localities. The town of Malgobek serves as its administrative center, despite being incorporated separately as a town of republic significance—an administrative unit with the status equal to that of the districts.

As a municipal division, the district is incorporated as Malgobeksky Municipal District. Its twelve rural localities are incorporated into twelve rural settlements within the municipal district. The town of republic significance of Malgobek is incorporated separately from the district as Malgobek Urban Okrug, but serves as the administrative center of the municipal district as well.

Border issues
Malgobeksky and Sunzhensky Districts are a point at issue in the Chechen-Ingush border delimitation discussion.

References

Notes

Sources

Districts of Ingushetia